The 2017 LFA Primeira is the second season of the Liga Futebol Amadora Primeira Divisão. The season began on February 18 and finished on September 16. 

Sport Laulara e Benfica is the current defending champions.

All Primeira Divisão games are played at the Baucau Municipal Stadium and Malibaca Yamato Stadium. Primeira Divisão games used Dili Municipal Stadium for matchday 12 on 10-13 August 2017, matchday 13 on 1-4 September 2017 and three matches in matchday 14 on 7-9 September 2017.

Stadiums  
Primary venues used in the 2017 LFA Primeira

Teams
There are 8 teams that will play this season.

from Primeira
Aitana and DIT F.C. were relegated to 2017 Segunda Divisao after finished 7th and bottom place of 2016 Primeira Divisao.

to Primeira
Cacusan and FC Zebra promoted to 2017 Primeira Divisao after securing place as champions and runners-up in 2016 Segunda Divisao.

Locations

Personnel

Foreign players

Restricting the number of foreign players strictly to four per team. A team could use four foreign players on the field each game.

League table

Result table

Season statistics

Top scorers

See also
 2017 LFA Segunda
 2017 Taça 12 de Novembro
 2017 LFA Super Taça
 2017 LFA Segunda Divisao Promotion Playoff

References

External links
Official website
Official Facebook page

LFA Primeira seasons
Timor-Leste